Canal Street Confidential is the eighth studio album by American rapper Curren$y. The album was released on December 4, 2015, by Jet Life Recordings and Atlantic Records.

Singles
On August 28, 2015 the album's first single "Bottom of the Bottle" featuring Wiz Khalifa and Lil Wayne was released. On October 30, 2015, the official music video was released.

Critical reception

Canal Street Confidential was met with mixed reviews from music critics. David Jeffries of AllMusic said, "It's another lark from a man who has taken plenty of them before, and while some may look to his major-label efforts for the more well-rounded LPs, they can check the Pilot Talk series for that kind of breadth, and appreciate Canal Street Confidential for the sharp and well-executed idea that it is." Ryan Staskel of Consequence of Sound gave the album a D+, saying "What we have here is an artist in cruise control taking a premature victory lap. If the Pilot Talk trilogy is Curren$y’s sky-high flight of fancy, then Canal Street Confidential feels more like a cab ride the day after a late night. “Roll one up for them haters,” Franklin rhymes on Canal Street Confidential. With that I ask, does anyone have a light?" Jesse Fairfax of HipHopDX said, "Largely unmemorable and full of cameos that only wind up watering down Curren$y’s potential for excellence, Canal Street Confidential is a textbook case of an artist with a cult following attempting to make use of a greater budget. Possibly the result of label interference, he trades innovation for collaborations that neither guarantee new fans or manage to impress believers."

Commercial performance
In the United States, the album debuted at number 30 on the Billboard 200, selling nearly 21,000 units in its first week.

Track listing

 Notes
 signifies an additional producer.

Charts

Weekly charts

Year-end charts

References

2015 albums
Currensy albums
Atlantic Records albums
Albums produced by Cool & Dre